David Liaño González (born December 19, 1979) is the first mountaineer to double summit on Mount Everest from both the Nepal and Tibet sides, which he has climbed six times so far. He has climbed both versions of the Seven Summits

Liaño Gonzalez has also lived in Seattle, Washington in the United States where he is also known as David Liano. When he brought a fan flag of a Seattle sports team to the summit of Everest in 2016, it made news stories across that country.

Early life
David Liaño González was born in Mexico City, Mexico. His career began with climbing the Mexican volcanoes and in 2003 he began to participate in international expeditions with Club Alpino Mexicano, mostly to Bolivia where he summitted Tarija Peak (5,060m), Pequeño Alpamayo (5,300m), Condoriri (5,648m) and Huayna Potosí (6,088m).
He is married to Prarthana Purushothaman, and lives in Seattle.

Seven Summits
Liaño González completed both versions of the Seven Summits on August 18, 2006, taking 2 years and 195 days to complete the project:

Climbing Mount Everest
Liaño González climbed Mount Everest on May 11, 2013 from the south side in Nepal. Returning to Kathmandu on May 13, he was again atop the Everest on May 19, this time from the north side.

Liaño Gonzalez summited in 2016 achieving his sixth summiting of Everest.

See also
List of Mount Everest summiters by number of times to the summit

References

External links
 Everest 2013: Interview with David Liano – Double Summit

1979 births
Living people
Summiters of Mount Everest
Mexican mountain climbers